The Satellite Award for Best Supporting Actor in a Motion Picture is one of the annual Satellite Awards given by the International Press Academy. From 1996 to 2005, two categories were presented for supporting performances by male actors, one for performances in a drama film and other for performances in comedy or musical films. In 2006, both categories were merged into the current category without distinction by genre.

Winners and nominees
Winners are listed in bold type.

Drama (1996–2005)

Musical or Comedy (1996–2005)

Motion Picture

See also
 Academy Award for Best Supporting Actor
 Independent Spirit Award for Best Supporting Male

References

External links
 Official website

Actor - Motion Picture, Supporting
Film awards for supporting actor